Marcin Ryszard Wasilewski (born 9 June 1980) is a Polish former professional footballer who played as a centre back. He is best known for winning Premier League with Leicester City FC and getting injured after a horrible challenge by Axel Witsel during a match in 2009.

Career

Early career
Wasilewski was born in Kraków, Poland, and started his senior career at local club Hutnik Kraków before playing for Śląsk Wrocław and Wisła Płock. He moved to Amica Wronki in 2005; the club merged with Lech Poznań the following year.

Anderlecht
He was acquired by Belgian side Anderlecht in January 2007. During the 2008–09 season he was the club's third-most prolific goalscorer, tying with Guillaume Gillet at eight goals.

Leg injury
On 30 August 2009, Wasilewski suffered an open leg fracture in the 26th minute of the 1–1 Jupiler League draw between Anderlecht and Standard Liège when Liège's Axel Witsel made a challenge. Witsel was red-carded for the offence. Wasilewski underwent corrective surgery for open fractures to both the tibia and fibula. Witsel was suspended for eight games by the Belgian FA over the incident, after an appeal.

Return
After a long rehabilitation, Wasilewski made his return on 8 May 2010. He celebrated his return to Anderlecht's first eleven with the opening goal of his side's 2–1 win at S.V. Zulte Waregem.

His drive to return was rewarded with a new contract until the summer of 2013, with the club talking about him as "a club monument, who had to deliver an inhuman battle".

Wasilewski and Witsel, then of Zenit St. Petersburg, met again on the field on 24 October 2012 in a UEFA Champions League group match. Wasilewski announced in advance that he would refuse to shake hands with Witsel before the game, with Anderlecht management accepting his decision. However, he ultimately changed his mind and accepted Witsel's hand, saying that he didn't want to turn the atmosphere of the match into a personal duel.

Leicester City

On 14 September 2013, Wasilewski was reported to be undergoing a trial with Leicester City in the English Championship, in the hope of landing a contract. On 17 September he was confirmed as having signed for the Foxes on a one-year contract. He made his debut in a League Cup third-round match against Derby County on 24 September, playing the entire match as Leicester won 2–1. On 30 November 2013, a coachload of Anderlecht fans travelled to Leicester's King Power Stadium to support Wasilewski at his new club. There were emotional scenes after he played a key role in City's 3–0 win over Millwall. Wasilewski established himself as a first-team regular as Leicester finished the season as Championship champions and secured their return to the Premier League. On 22 May 2014, he extended his contract by a further year.

Wasilewski made his Premier League debut on 1 November 2014, in the 0–1 defeat against West Bromwich Albion, during which he appeared to elbow opposing striker Saido Berahino; however, the FA cleared the defender. On 31 January 2015, Wasilewski scored his first goal in English football, heading in a late consolation goal in Leicester's 3–1 defeat by Manchester United which was also the second goal ever scored in the Premier League by a Polish footballer; Robert Warzycha had scored in the competition's opening weekend,  years earlier. On 4 June, Wasilewski announced via his Instagram account that he had signed a new one-year contract with Leicester City.

He made his first league appearance of the 2015–16 Premier League season on 19 December 2015 when he started in a 3–2 win over Everton. Wasilewski played only two league games before Leicester's Premier League trophy presentation on 7 May 2016, making him ineligible for a winner's medal (a minimum of five league games is required). Nonetheless, owing to teammate Robert Huth's suspension, Wasilewski played the final two matches of the Premier League season, taking his appearances up to four. On 14 June 2016, Wasilewski signed a one-year extension to his contract.

Wasilewski's first senior appearance in 2016–17 ended in his dismissal in the 89th minute for elbowing Diego Costa in a 2–4 EFL Cup third-round defeat to Chelsea on 20 September 2016.

International
Wasilewski made his debut in a friendly match against Denmark in Copenhagen on 20 November 2002. Wasilewski was also part of the Poland squads for Euro 2008 and Euro 2012.

Career statistics

Club

International

International goals
Scores and results list Poland's goal tally first.

Honours
Anderlecht
Belgian Pro League: 2006–07, 2009–10, 2011–12, 2012–13
Belgian Cup: 2007–08
Belgian Super Cup: 2007, 2010

Leicester City
Premier League: 2015–16
Football League Championship: 2013–14

References

External links

National team stats on the website of the Polish Football Association 

1980 births
Living people
Śląsk Wrocław players
Wisła Płock players
Amica Wronki players
Lech Poznań players
R.S.C. Anderlecht players
Hutnik Nowa Huta players
Leicester City F.C. players
Wisła Kraków players
Polish footballers
Poland international footballers
Polish expatriate footballers
Footballers from Kraków
Belgian Pro League players
English Football League players
Premier League players
Expatriate footballers in Belgium
UEFA Euro 2008 players
UEFA Euro 2012 players
Ekstraklasa players
Association football defenders